The WikiWikiWeb is the first wiki, or user-editable website. It was launched on 25 March 1995 by programmer Ward Cunningham to accompany the Portland Pattern Repository website discussing software design patterns. The name WikiWikiWeb originally also applied to the wiki software that operated the website, written in the Perl programming language and later renamed to "WikiBase". The site is frequently referred to by its users as simply "Wiki", and a convention established among users of the early network of wiki sites that followed was that using the word with a capitalized W referred exclusively to the original site.

History 
The software and website were developed in 1994 by Cunningham in order to make the exchange of ideas between programmers easier. The concept was based on the ideas developed in HyperCard stacks that Cunningham built in the late 1980s. On March 25, 1995, he installed the software on his company's (Cunningham & Cunningham) website, c2.com. Cunningham came up with the name WikiWikiWeb because he remembered a Honolulu International Airport counter employee who told him to take the Wiki Wiki Shuttle, a shuttle bus line that runs between the airport's terminals. "Wiki Wiki" is a reduplication of "wiki", a Hawaiian language word for "quick". Cunningham's idea was to make WikiWikiWeb's pages quickly editable by its users, so he initially thought about calling it "QuickWeb", but later changed his mind and dubbed it "WikiWikiWeb".

, the WikiWikiWeb's WelcomeVisitors page contained the following description in the first two paragraphs:

Hyperlinks between pages on WikiWikiWeb are created by joining capitalized words together, a technique referred to as camel case. This convention of wiki markup formatting is still followed by some more recent wiki software, whereas others, such as the MediaWiki software that powers Wikipedia, allow links without camel case.

In December 2014, WikiWikiWeb came under the attack of vandals, and was put into a read-only state. On February 1, 2015 Cunningham announced that the Wiki had been rewritten as a single-page application and migrated to the new Federated Wiki.

See also 
 History of wikis

References

External links 
 WikiWikiWeb
 The WikiBase software
 Wiki design principles
 The history of WikiWikiWeb, including comments by Ward Cunningham
 Correspondence on the Etymology of Wiki

Wiki communities
Perl software
Free wiki software
Internet properties established in 1995
American websites
1995 in computing